Susaye Greene (born September 13, 1948) is an American singer and songwriter. She was the last official member to join the Motown girl group The Supremes, remaining in the group during its final years of existence from 1976 to 1977. She is a successful songwriter as well, having written hit records for Michael Jackson, Deniece Williams, and many others.

Biography

Early life and career
Born in Houston, Texas, Greene began her professional career at age 12. As a teenager, she moved to New York City where she attended Professional Children School, graduating in 1966 and later from the New York City High School of Performing Arts, and appeared in various commercials. Prior to joining The Supremes, Greene sang with Ray Charles' Raelettes and Stevie Wonder's Wonderlove, which paired her with Deniece Williams and Shirley Brewer. In 1973 she sang lead as a guest vocalist on New Birth's hit "Until It's Time for You to Go" (a cover of Buffy Sainte-Marie's song). In 1975 she co-wrote "Free", Deniece Williams' breakthrough single.

The Supremes
Greene was a member of The Supremes from early 1976 to summer of 1977 (replacing Cindy Birdsong), and performed on their last two albums, High Energy and Mary, Scherrie & Susaye. Working alongside original member Mary Wilson and Scherrie Payne, Susaye quickly found her niche in the group and amongst the group's legions of fans. Susaye took lead on "He Ain't Heavy, He's My Brother," in the group's live shows, which never failed to garner a standing ovation, and recorded "High Energy", the title song from the High Energy album. On June 12, 1977, the Supremes performed their farewell concert at the Drury Lane Theater in London and disbanded.

After The Supremes
In 1979, two years after The Supremes disbanded, Greene recorded a duet album with fellow former Supreme Scherrie Payne entitled Partners under the name "Scherrie & Susaye." She also hosted her own cable television show, Hollywood Hot, and continued writing for various artists. One of her most noteworthy compositions was the track "I Can't Help It", co-written with Stevie Wonder for Michael Jackson's Off the Wall.

While touring England in 1984 with Stevie Wonder, Greene met her present husband in London and relocated there. In 1986, she sang lead on jazz saxophonist Courtney Pine's single "Children of the Ghetto". She signed with Ian Levine's Motorcity label, based in the United Kingdom, in 1989. She released two solo singles on Motorcity – "Stop, I Need You Now" (1990) and her own version of Deniece Williams' hit "Free" (1991). At Motorcity, she also recorded the duet "It's Impossible" with Billy Eckstine.  An unreleased demo recording of "Don't Pity The Fool" also exists, although no vocals were added. On July 5, 2014, Ms. Greene, along with Scherrie Payne performed at the Sheraton in Los Angeles a concert program based on their album "Partners" which was released by Motown in 1979.  They were featured in the magazine Daeida, with a beautiful photo shoot. The article chronicled career highlights with the Supremes and separately and the re-release of their "Partners" album on CD.

In October 2017, Greene replaced Lynda Laurence in the Former Ladies of the Supremes alongside Scherrie Payne and Joyce Vincent Wilson. Her joining the group is ironic as that in 1977, when Mary Wilson departed the Supremes for a solo career, there was initial thought that Scherrie and Susaye would continue the group with a new third member. It was widely speculated that Joyce Vincent would round out the trio. Instead, Motown Records decided that without any original members, the Supremes would be disbanded. With the addition of Susaye to the Former Ladies, the "fantasy" line up of Scherrie, Susaye, and Joyce has now become reality.

Solo albums
Around the turn of the century, Greene moved back to the States, and in 2002, she finally released her first solo album, No Fear Here. Two singles and a video were released to critical acclaim. Greene penned most of the album herself. Susaye Greene released her second solo album, Brave New Shoes, in 2005.

Album appearances
High Energy – with The Supremes
Mary, Scherrie & Susaye – with The Supremes
At Their Best – with The Supremes
Partners – duet album with former Supreme Scherrie Payne
Songs in the Key of Life – Stevie Wonder (background vocals)
Hotter than July – Stevie Wonder (background vocals)
Journey to the Urge Within – Courtney Pine (Lead vocals on "Children of The Ghetto", 1986)
Vital Blue – Blue Mitchell (Mainstream, 1971)

Songwriting credits
"Free" – Deniece Williams
"Stop! I Need You Now"
"No Fear Here"
"Bewitched"
"I Can't Help It" – included in Michael Jackson's 1979 release Off the Wall; later included in Pebbles 1995 release, "Straight from My Heart". Also Davina in 1998.

Filmography

Presence in the online artistic community
Susaye Greene is also a member of the world's largest online art community, DeviantArt. She joined DeviantArt on September 17, 2004, under the pseudonym "supremextreme". On September 21, 2005, Susaye was featured on DeviantArt's on-site chat network, "dAmn", for one of the community's regularly sponsored "Featured Chats". She interacted with members of the DeviantArt community-at-large, answering questions about her life, career, inspirations, motivations, and her time on the art site itself. Greene continues to be an active member on DeviantArt and is preparing 3D images of her Supremextreme character for her first short animated feature film. She is also a key figure in The one million masterpiece charity project, an online arts event aiming to raise over $6 million for global causes. Susaye is heavily involved in the marketing of the project to the artistic community.

Personal life

Susaye was married to Ed Brown; together they owned a company called "Mud", a mixture of their colorful names, Brown and Greene. Susaye is currently married to Stephen Coton; they have one son, Daniel.

References

External links
SupremeXtreme

1949 births
Living people
African-American women singer-songwriters
Motown artists
American expatriates in the United Kingdom
American rhythm and blues singer-songwriters
American soul singers
Musicians from Houston
The Supremes members
20th-century African-American women singers
21st-century African-American women singers
Singer-songwriters from Texas
The Raelettes members